Death and the Judge is a 2018 documentary film directed by Hassan Khademi.
The film narrates the life and career of Nourollah Aziz-Mohammadi, an Iranian criminal judge who has issued more than 4 thousand death sentences during his career.
The film won the AIFIC Award at the Iran's Cinema Verite Film Festival and the Bertha Fund Award at the Amsterdam International Documentary Film Festival.

Reception
Reza Hosseini points out that the film has its weaknesses, but the appeal of the subject and the stubbornness of the filmmaker make it spectacular.
Salahedin Ghaderi (from Kharazmi University) provides a sociological review of the film and calls it a "good text" for sociological inquiry.

Seyed Reza Saemi believes that "the hardest part of judging is the judgment of the offender sentenced to death, and that is enough to probably make negative assumptions about this judge in the minds of the audience, but as the film progresses and we become more familiar with Aziz Mohammadi's character, gradually that presumptuous stance comes closer to a fair trial."

See also
Rapping in Tehran

References

External links
 

2018 documentary films
Iranian documentary films
Documentary films about capital punishment
2010s Persian-language films
Documentary films about crime
Films about murder